The 2022–23 Ohio State Buckeyes women's basketball represents Ohio State University in the 2022–23 college basketball season. Led by tenth year head coach Kevin McGuff, the team plays their games at Value City Arena and at the Covelli Center and are members of the Big Ten Conference.

Schedule and results
Source:
|-
!colspan=12 style=| Exhibition

|-
!colspan=12 style=| Regular Season

|-
! colspan=9 style=| Big Ten Women's Tournament

|-
! colspan=9 style=| NCAA Women's Tournament

Rankings

See also
 2022–23 Ohio State Buckeyes men's basketball team

References

Ohio State Buckeyes women's basketball seasons
Ohio State Buckeyes
Ohio State Buckeyes women's basketball
Ohio State Buckeyes women's basketball
Ohio State